Hugo Viktor Österman (5 September 1892, Helsinki – 17 February 1975) was a Finnish lieutenant-general during World War II. He was commander of the Finnish Army 1933–1939.

When the Winter War started Österman was made commander of the Army of the Isthmus, but was dismissed on 19 February 1940 after the Finnish lines had been breached.

Österman served as Deputy Minister of Defence from 10 June 1930 to 21 March 1931.

Further reading
Hartikainen, Pertti. Leader, Builder and Defender of the Armed Forces Jaeger General Hugo Viktor Österman (1892–1975). Helsinki, 2001.

External links 

1892 births
1975 deaths
Military personnel from Helsinki
People from Uusimaa Province (Grand Duchy of Finland)
Swedish-speaking Finns
Ministers of Defence of Finland
Finnish lieutenant generals
German military personnel of World War I
People of the Finnish Civil War (White side)
Finnish military personnel of World War II
Grand Officiers of the Légion d'honneur
Jägers of the Jäger Movement